Accademia Italiana Thailand is a fashion and design institute founded in 2006 in Bangkok's Watthana District.
Accademia Italiana Thailland no longer carries out any type of academic activity.

External links 
 
 Official website (Italy)

Design schools
Education in Bangkok
Educational institutions established in 2006
2006 establishments in Thailand